Graff's Market was an historic, commercial building that was located in the community of Indiana in Indiana County, Pennsylvania.

It was added to the National Register of Historic Places in 1980.

History and architectural features
Built between 1887 and 1892, Graff's Market was a three-story, wood building that was erected on a stone foundation in Indiana, Pennsylvania.

Designed with a cast-iron storefront in a High Victorian Italianate-style, the building measured thirty feet by fifty-seven feet, six inches, and had a flat roof. 

The building housed the Graff family business for more than ninety years. 

It was added to the National Register of Historic Places in 1980.

The structure has since been demolished; a modern two-story brick office building was erected in its place.

References

Indiana, Pennsylvania
Cast-iron architecture in the United States
Commercial buildings on the National Register of Historic Places in Pennsylvania
Italianate architecture in Pennsylvania
Commercial buildings completed in 1892
Buildings and structures in Indiana County, Pennsylvania
National Register of Historic Places in Indiana County, Pennsylvania